Pedro de Solier y Vargas (1573 – July 9, 1620) was a Roman Catholic prelate who served as the Archbishop of Santo Domingo (1619–1620) and Bishop of Puerto Rico (1614–1619).

Biography
Nicolás de Ramos y Santos was born in Barajas, Spain and ordained a priest in the Order of St. Augustine on February 13, 1594. On November 17, 1614, he was appointed by the King of Spain and confirmed by Pope Paul V as Bishop of Puerto Rico. In 1616, he was consecrated bishop by Diego de Contreras, Archbishop of Santo Domingo. On December 16, 1619, he was appointed by the King of Spain and confirmed by Pope Paul V as Archbishop of Santo Domingo where served until his death on July 9, 1620.

References

External links and additional sources
 (for Chronology of Bishops) 
 (for Chronology of Bishops) 
 (for Chronology of Bishops) 
 (for Chronology of Bishops) 

1573 births
1620 deaths
Bishops appointed by Pope Paul V
Augustinian bishops
Roman Catholic archbishops of Santo Domingo
17th-century Roman Catholic bishops in Puerto Rico
17th-century Roman Catholic archbishops in the Dominican Republic
Roman Catholic bishops of Puerto Rico